Fredrik "Fidde" Andersson (born 18 January 1971) is a retired Swedish football defender who spent most of his career with Halmstads BK.

Andersson made around 500 appearances for Halmstads BK, helping them win the 1997 and 2000 Allsvenskan titles, as well as the 1994–95 Svenska Cupen.

He appeared twice for the Sweden U21 team, and once for the Sweden B team.

Honours

Club 
Halmstads BK

 Allsvenskan: 1997, 2000
 Svenska Cupen: 1994–95

Individual 

 HP:s Dribbler: 1996

References

1971 births
Living people
Swedish footballers
Halmstads BK players
Association football defenders
Allsvenskan players
Sportspeople from Halmstad
Sportspeople from Halland County